The 2015 ITS Cup was a professional tennis tournament played on outdoor clay courts. It was the seventh edition of the tournament and part of the 2015 ITF Women's Circuit, offering a total of $50,000 in prize money. It took place in Olomouc, Czech Republic, on 13–19 June 2015.

Singles main draw entrants

Seeds 

 1 Rankings as of 29 June 2015

Other entrants 
The following players received wildcards into the singles main draw:
  Jesika Malečková
  Tereza Malíková
  Petra Rohanová
  Lenka Wienerová

The following players received entry from the qualifying draw:
  Lenka Kunčíková
  Karolína Muchová
  Petra Uberalová
  Zuzana Zálabská

The following player received entry by a lucky loser spot:
  Adrijana Lekaj

Champions

Singles

 Barbora Krejčíková def.  Petra Cetkovská, 3–6, 6–4, 7–6(7–5)

Doubles

 Lenka Kunčíková /  Karolína Stuchlá def.  Cindy Burger /  Kateřina Vaňková, 1–6, 6–4, [12–10]

External links 
 2015 ITS Cup at ITFtennis.com
 Official website 

2015 ITF Women's Circuit
2015
2015 in Czech women's sport
2015 in Czech tennis
ITS Cup